Wolfgang Böhmer (born 27 January 1936) is a German politician (CDU) and was the 5th Minister-President of Saxony-Anhalt from 16 May 2002 to 19 April 2011. He served as President of the Bundesrat in 2002/03. He formerly worked as a medical doctor.

Political career
Böhmer was born in Dürrhennersdorf, Saxony, and joined the CDU of East Germany in 1990.

Böhmer publicly spoke out against Angela Merkel and instead endorsed Edmund Stoiber as the party's candidate to challenge incumbent Chancellor Gerhard Schröder in the 2002 federal elections. During his own campaign to unseat incumbent Minister-President Reinhard Höppner of Saxony-Anhalt in the state elections, he focused on economic recovery and received strong backing from Stoiber.

Böhmer is an Honorary Member of The International Raoul Wallenberg Foundation.

Recognition
 2007 – Order of Merit of the Federal Republic of Germany
 2015 – Order of Merit of Saxony-Anhalt

References

External links

1936 births
Living people
Presidents of the German Bundesrat
People from Görlitz (district)
Ministers-President of Saxony-Anhalt
Members of the Landtag of Saxony-Anhalt
German Protestants
Grand Crosses with Star and Sash of the Order of Merit of the Federal Republic of Germany